Brit Griffin is a Canadian journalist and writer.

Biography
Griffin met musician and politician Charlie Angus in 1981, when Angus was a member of the band L'Étranger. They married, cofounded a homeless shelter in downtown Toronto in 1985, and subsequently moved to Cobalt, Ontario in 1990. In 1995, while living in Cobalt, Griffin and Angus cofounded HighGrader; Griffin acted as the magazine's publisher, while Angus was its editor.

Griffin was a co-author with Angus of the 1996 book We Lived a Life and Then Some and the 1998 musical play Wildcat. She has also been published in the Jesuit magazine Compass.

In 2014, she published her debut novel, The Wintermen, with Sudbury-based Scrivener Press. In 2018, she released the sequel, "The Wintermen II: Into the Deep Dark" with Latitude 46.

Griffin's poetry has been published in Room, a magazine focusing on literature, art, and feminism. She has published short stories in Climate Culture.

Awards and honours
Griffin won two American Catholic Press awards for her writing and works as a freelancer in print, video, and radio. She currently works for First Nations.

References

Living people
Canadian magazine journalists
Canadian women dramatists and playwrights
Canadian women novelists
Canadian activists
Spouses of Canadian politicians
Canadian magazine publishers (people)
People from Cobalt, Ontario
Writers from Timmins
Canadian women journalists
20th-century Canadian dramatists and playwrights
20th-century Canadian women writers
21st-century Canadian novelists
21st-century Canadian women writers
Canadian women non-fiction writers
Year of birth missing (living people)